Starbucks is a mixtape by rapper's All Star Cashville Prince & Young Buck. The mixtape features exclusive tracks and freestyles from All Star & Young Buck with appearances by Yo Gotti, The Outlawz, $o$a Da Plug, and more. It was released for digital download and sale on iTunes on June 13, 2008. It was mainly released to promote the upcoming collab album Cashville Takeover from Ca$hville Records. Later in 2009 rapper Yo Gotti released the mixtape through his label Inevitable Entertainment as well.

Track list

References

2008 mixtape albums
Young Buck albums